Sin is an act of transgression against divine law.

Sin or SIN may also refer to:

Arts and entertainment

Fictional characters
 Sin (DC Comics)
 Sin (Marvel Comics)
 Sin, a Final Fantasy X character
 Sin Kiske, a Guilty Gear character
 Mr Sin, a Doctor Who henchman

Film and television 
 Sin (1915 film), an American silent drama film 
 Sin (1928 film), a British-Swedish silent drama film
 Sin (1948 film), a Swedish drama film
 Sin (2003 film), an American crime thriller film
 Sin (2019 film), a Russian-Italian drama film
 Sin: The Movie, a 2000 Japanese animated film
 "Sin", an episode of Fullmetal Alchemist
 "Sin", an episode of Law & Order: Special Victims Unit (season 8)
 WCW Sin, a 2001 wrestling event

Music 
 Sin (album), by Mother Superior, 2002
 Sin/Pecado, an album by Moonspell, 1998
 "Sin" (song), by Nine Inch Nails, 1990
 "Sin", a 1992 song by Stone Temple Pilots from Core
 "Sin", a 1997 song by Megadeth from Cryptic Writings
 "Sin", a 2011 song by Jani Lane
 "(It's No) Sin", a 1951 song
 "Sin Sin Sin", a single by Robbie Williams, 2006

Other uses in arts and entertainment
 SiN, a first-person shooter video game 
 Sin (José novel), by F. Sionil José
Sin (Prilepin novel), a 2007 novel by Zakhar Prilepin
 Sin Newspaper, a student newspaper in Galway, Ireland

Businesses and organisations
SIN Cars, a Bulgarian supercar manufacturer
Servicio de Inteligencia Nacional (National Intelligence Service), Peru
Sistema de Inteligencia Nacional (National Intelligence System), Argentina
Service d'Intelligence National (National Intelligence Service), Haiti
Spanish International Network, a former TV network

People 
 Shan (surname), the Chinese surname 單/单 or 冼, both romanised as Sin in Cantonese
 Shin (Korean surname), or Sin
 Jaime Sin (1928–2005), a Roman Catholic cardinal in the Philippines
 Abigail Sin (born 1992), a Singaporean concert pianist
 Sin Boon Ann (born 1958), a Singaporean politician and lawyer
 Sin Chung-kai (born 1960), a Hong Kong politician
 Dahlia Sin, American drag queen
 Damien Sin (1965–2011), a Singaporean author, poet and musician
 Oleksandr Sin (born 1961), a Ukrainian politician
 Sin Quirin, an American guitar player

Places 
 Şin, Azerbaijan
 Sin, Iran, Isfahan Province
 Sen, Iran, or Sin, Khuzestan Province
 Sin River, Huai Mae Sin, Thailand
 Sin, the ancient Greek and Roman name for China
 Kingdom of Sine or Sin, in modern Senegal
 Sin, Hebrew name of Pelusium in ancient Egypt
 Singapore Changi Airport, IATA airport code SIN
 Wilderness of Sin, a geographic area mentioned in the Bible

Other uses
 Sin, abbreviation for sine, a math function
 Sin (Mandaeism), the Mandaean name for the moon
 Sin (mythology), a moon deity in the Mesopotamian religions
 Sin, the sky god and chief deity in Haida mythology
 Sinhala language, ISO 939-2/3 language code sin
 Sex Industry Network (SIN)
 Social insurance number (SIN)
 Las Vegas Sin, a team in the Legends Football League
 Shin (letter), or Šin, a letter of many Semitic alphabets

See also 
 Sins (disambiguation)
 Sinner (disambiguation)
 Sine (disambiguation)
 The Sin (disambiguation)